Bandl's ring (also known as pathological retraction ring) is the abnormal junction between the two segments of the human uterus, which is a late sign associated with obstructed labor. Prior to the onset of labour, the junction between the lower and upper uterine segments is a slightly thickened ring. In abnormal and obstructed labours, after the cervix has reached full dilatation further contractions cause the upper uterine segment muscle fibres myometrium to shorten, so that the actively contracting upper segment becomes thicker and shorter. The ridge of the pathological ring of Bandl's can be felt or seen rising as far up as the umbilicus. The lower segment becomes stretched and thinner and if neglected may lead to uterine rupture.
It is Major pathology behind obstructed labor.
A circular groove encircling the uterus is formed between the active upper segment and the distended lower segment. Due to pronounced retraction, there is fetal jeopardy or even death.
It was first described by Ludwig Bandl an Austrian obstetrician.

References

Textbook of obstetrica by Hirala Conor

Mammal female reproductive system